Oszkár Vilezsál (17 September 1930 – 20 July 1980) was a Hungarian footballer. He competed in the men's tournament at the 1960 Summer Olympics.

References

External links
 

1930 births
1980 deaths
Hungarian footballers
Olympic footballers of Hungary
Footballers at the 1960 Summer Olympics
People from Salgótarján
Association football midfielders
Medalists at the 1960 Summer Olympics
Olympic bronze medalists for Hungary
Olympic medalists in football
Nemzeti Bajnokság I managers
Sportspeople from Nógrád County
Ferencvárosi TC footballers
Salgótarjáni BTC footballers
Hungarian football managers
Ferencvárosi TC managers